Agolli is a surname. People with this surname include:

 Ansi Agolli (born 1982), Albanian footballer
 Dritëro Agolli (1931–2017), Albanian writer
 Ervis  Agolli (born 1982), Albanian footballer
 Esma Agolli (1928–2010), Albanian actress 
 Lejla Agolli (born 1950), Albanian composer
 Nexhat Agolli (1914–1949), Albanian politician

Albanian-language surnames